Petar Kanchev (born 4 September 1977) is a Bulgarian footballer currently playing for PFC Chernomorets Balchik as a midfielder.

External links
  

1977 births
Living people
Bulgarian footballers
Second Professional Football League (Bulgaria) players
First Professional Football League (Bulgaria) players
Neftochimic Burgas players
PFC Vidima-Rakovski Sevlievo players
PFC Akademik Svishtov players
FC Lokomotiv Gorna Oryahovitsa players
Association football midfielders